Dejang-e Pain (also Romanized as Dejang-e Pā’īn; also known as Dejank and Dejīng-e Pā’īn) is a village in Taftan-e Jonubi Rural District, Nukabad District, Khash County, Sistan and Baluchestan Province, Iran. At the 2006 census, its population was 20, in 5 families.

References 

Populated places in Khash County